Polyommatus nephohiptamenos, or Higgins's anomalous blue, is a butterfly of the family Lycaenidae described by J. Brown and John G. Coutsis in 1978. 
It has an IUCN Red List status of near threatened.

Description

The Higgins's anomalous blue (Polyommatus nephohiptamenos) is in the family Lycaenidae. 
It was described by Brown and Coutsis in 1978. 
Polyommatus nephohiptamenos was thought to possibly be a subspecies or form of Polyommatus ripartii, Ripart's anomalous blue.
A 2016 paper confirmed that it was a distinct species based on distinct COI mitochondrial DNA barcodes and ecological differentiation. 
The fringes of the male are whiter than with P. ripartii.

Habitat

P. nephohiptamenos is endemic to Europe, found only in mountains of northern Greece and occasionally of southern Bulgaria. 
It is found in a small area at higher altitudes of the Phalakron Massif in Greece and Bulgaria. It has a dot-like distribution range. 
It has been found on Mount Pangeon and Mount Phalakro in Greece, and Mount Orvilos on the border between Greece and Bulgaria, and Mount Alibotush and Kitka Planina in Bulgaria. 
It is probably limited to less than 10 locations within an area of occupancy under . 

Life cycle

P. nephohiptamenos has one generation per year. 
It feeds on the perennial sainfoin Onobrychis montana ssp. scardica, which is endemic to the Balkans. 
The caterpillars hibernate while still small, and feed on the new leaves of the sainfoin the next spring. 
The butterfly flies in mid-July and August. 
The butterfly may be threatened by intensified grazing, abandonment and wildfires. 
It has an IUCN Red List status of near threatened.

Notes

Sources

ninae
Butterflies described in 1978